Shajahan Chowdhury is a Bangladesh Jamaat-e-Islami politician and a former Jatiya Sangsad member from the Chittagong-14 constituency.

Career
Chowdhury was elected to parliament from Chittagong-14 as a Bangladesh Jamaat-e-Islami candidate in 1991 and 2001.

Chowdhury was arrested on 1 May 2019. According to the local police, there had been 50 violence cases against him.

References

Living people
Bangladesh Jamaat-e-Islami politicians
5th Jatiya Sangsad members
7th Jatiya Sangsad members
Year of birth missing (living people)
People from Satkania Upazila